This is a list of European colonial administrators responsible for the territory of French Equatorial Africa, an area equivalent to modern-day Gabon, Cameroon, Republic of the Congo, Central African Republic and Chad.

List

(Dates in italics indicate de facto continuation of office)

See also
French Equatorial Africa
Cameroon
French Cameroons
Chad
French Chad
Central African Republic
Ubangi-Shari
Republic of the Congo
French Congo
Gabon
Lists of office-holders
List of French possessions and colonies
French colonial empire
French colonial flags

External links

French colonial people in Cameroon
Political history of Chad
History of Gabon
History of Guinea
History of the Republic of the Congo
Equatorial Africa
Colonial heads
Colonial heads
Colonial heads
Colonial heads